State Route 13 (SR 13), in the United States, is a south–north route from the Alabama border in Wayne County to the Kentucky border in Montgomery County. The entire route is located in western Middle Tennessee.

For the majority of its length, SR 13 is designated as a primary highway, except between Erin and Cunningham, which is designated as a secondary highway.

Route description

Wayne County
SR 13 begins at the Alabama state line in Wayne County just south of Fairview, where it continues south as SR 17. It then goes north through Fairview and has an intersection and short concurrency with SR 227 before continuing north, crossing under, and paralleling the Natchez Trace Parkway for a few miles to Collinwood, where it intersects with SR 203. It then goes through downtown and has an interchange with the Natchez Trace before finally leaving it and continuing north. SR 13 goes through some rural mountains and farmland before entering Waynesboro. It goes through downtown, passing by the Wayne County Courthouse, before having an interchange with  US 64/SR 15 before leaving Waynesboro and continuing north. It then goes through more before curving through some mountains and intersecting SR 228. It then exits these mountains and crosses a narrow valley, where it has a crossing of the Buffalo River, before intersecting SR 48 and returning to the mountains and crosses into Perry County.

SR 13 does parallel the Green River for the majority of its course.

Perry County

SR 13 then heads northeast and has another Buffalo river crossing, this time over a very tall bridge, before turning north again. It then intersects SR 128 before entering Linden. In Linden, it intersects with US 412/SR 100/SR 20, while bypassing downtown to the east. It then leaves Linden and continues north. SR 13 then passes through Beardstown, where it intersects and has a short concurrency with SR 438 before paralleling the Buffalo River and entering Lobelville. It passes through Lobelville and continues north, still paralleling and also crossing the Buffalo River before crossing into Humphreys County.

Humphreys County

SR 13 then enters Hurricane Mills and has an interchange with I-40, at Exit 143. It then crosses the Duck River before passing by downtown and Loretta Lynn's home and ranch. It then leaves Hurricane Mills and continues north. SR 13 intersects with SR 230 before entering Waverly and having an intersection SR 13 Spur, a connector to US 70/SR 1 at Waverly. From Waverly, SR 13 continues north to cross into Houston County.

Houston County

It then intersects with SR 231 before entering Erin and has an intersection with SR 49, just east of its intersection with SR 149. SR 13 then turns east and has an intersection with SR 46 just south of Cumberland City before entering Montgomery County.

Montgomery County

It then passes south of Oak Ridge and intersects SR 235 before entering Cunningham where it intersects and becomes concurrent with SR 48. SR 13/SR 48 then leaves Cunningham and continues north to intersect with SR 149 before crossing the Cumberland River and entering Clarksville. In Clarksville, it becomes concurrent to US 41A Bypass/SR 12.  They then start going up the west side of the city, SR 48 separates and turns east, while US 41A Bypass/SR 12/SR 13 continues north to an intersection with US 41A/US 79/SR 76, where SR 13 leaves the bypass and heads east with US 79 and has another short concurrency with SR 48, where they cross the Red River and pass by Dunbar Cave State Park, before having an interchange with SR 374 (101st Airborne Division Parkway). US 79/SR 13 then go northeast and have an interchange with I-24 at Exit 4 before coming to the Kentucky state line, where US 79 crosses into Kentucky and SR 13 ends.

Special routes of SR 13

Tennessee State Route 13 Spur

State Route 13 Spur (SR 13 Spur) is a truck route in downtown Waverly, in Humphreys County.
East Main Street (from SR 13 to Cooley Avenue), and
North Cooley Avenue (from Main Street to US 70/SR 1).

Major intersections

See also 
List of state routes in Tennessee

References 

013